is a former Japanese football player and manager. She played for Japan national team.

Club career
Suzuki was born in Chiba on January 21, 1957. She started playing career at Mitsubishi Heavy Industries. In 1985, she moved to FC Jinnan (later Nissan FC). In 1990, she moved to her local new club, Nikko Securities Dream Ladies. End of 1991 season, she retired. During 2002 season, she came back as playing manager at JEF United Ichihara. In 2004 season, she played 9 games in L.League. She made the records for the oldest player in L.League match at the age of 47 years.

National team career
On October 24, 1984, when Suzuki was 27 years old, she debuted for Japan national team against Italy. She played at 1986, 1989, 1991 AFC Championship and 1990 Asian Games. She was also a member of Japan for 1991 World Cup. This competition was her last game for Japan. She played 45 games for Japan until 1991.

Coaching career
After retirement, in 2000, Suzuki became manager for JEF United Ichihara. End of 2004 season, she was succeeded by Takashi Uemura and she became assistant coach until 2017 season.

National team statistics

References

External links

1957 births
Living people
Association football people from Chiba Prefecture
Japanese women's footballers
Japan women's international footballers
Nadeshiko League players
Nissan FC Ladies players
Nikko Securities Dream Ladies players
JEF United Chiba Ladies players
Japanese women's football managers
Footballers at the 1990 Asian Games
Asian Games medalists in football
1991 FIFA Women's World Cup players
Women's association football goalkeepers
Asian Games silver medalists for Japan
Medalists at the 1990 Asian Games